The Cedars, also known as Ardis House or Atkinson House, is a house in Beech Island, South Carolina. It was listed on the U.S. National Register of Historic Places in 1993.

References

Houses on the National Register of Historic Places in South Carolina
National Register of Historic Places in Aiken County, South Carolina
Houses in Aiken County, South Carolina